Ullånger is a locality situated in Kramfors Municipality, Västernorrland County, Sweden with 626 inhabitants in 2010.

References 

Populated places in Kramfors Municipality
Ångermanland